Polypedates bengalensis, the brown blotched Bengal tree frog, is a species of frog in the family Rhacophoridae. It is endemic to West Bengal, India.

Etymology 
The specific name, bengalensis, is a reference to the type locality of the species located in the state of West Bengal, India.

Distribution 
The species, native to eastern India, was first described from Khordanahala, South 24 Parganas and Badu, North 24 Parganas in West Bengal. A while after the species was recorded, it was also reported in Odisha, India.

Description 
The frog is mid-sized; males are 4.8–5.4 cm in length, and females about 7.2 cm. It is yellowish-brown to greenish-brown in colour. Its body is marked by a series of six to nine dark brown blotches. Its digits lack webbing. There is no dermal fold on forearm. The males possess paired vocal sacs.

References 

Amphibians described in 2019
bengalensis